Walton Micro-Tech Corporation is situated near the Walton Hi-Tech Industries Limited’s factory at Chandra in Gazipur. It is the manufacturing, assembling and R&D plant for Walton's electronics products such as mobiles, televisions (CRT, LED), home appliances (blender, rice cooker, induction cooker, air fryer, rechargeable fan, air cooler, hair dryer, DVD players etc.), electrical appliances, LED lights, battery, electric motor etc. Walton mobiles are one of the most selling products of Walton Micro-Tech Corporation and also is one of the best selling mobile brands in Bangladesh. Walton produces Android smartphones and some Windows phones. Walton Primo is a series of mobile computing devices designed, manufactured and marketed by Walton Electronics. The series consists of high-end Android-powered smartphones.

Accolades
Local Awards:
 Best TV AD (Walton Television) awarded by Bangladesh Film Journalist forum.
 Best TV AD (Walton MicroWave Oven) awarded by television Dorshok Forum.
 Best TV AD (Walton Television) awarded by DCCA-Binodondhara.

References

External links
 Official website

Electronics companies of Bangladesh
Home appliance manufacturers of Bangladesh
Mobile phone manufacturers
Bangladeshi brands
Walton Group